Now Deh and Nowdeh or Naudeh or Nudeh may refer to:

Ardabil Province
 Now Deh, Khalkhal, a village in Khalkhal County
 Nowdeh, Kowsar, a village in Kowsar County
 Now Deh, Namin, a village in Namin County
 Now Deh, alternate name of Nowjeh Deh, Ardabil, a village in Namin County

Gilan Province
 Now Deh, Fuman, a village in Fuman County
 Nowdeh, Rasht, a village in Rasht County
 Now Deh, Rezvanshahr, a village in Rezvanshahr County
 Now Deh, Amarlu, a village in Rudbar County
 Now Deh, Khorgam, a village in Rudbar County
 Now Deh, Rudsar, a village in Rudsar County
 Now Deh, Shaft, a village in Shaft County
 Now Deh-e Pasikhan, a village in Shaft County
 Nowdeh, Sowme'eh Sara, a village in Sowme'eh Sara County
 Now Deh, Talesh, a village in Talesh County

Golestan Province
 Now Deh, Golestan
 Now Deh Garrison, Golestan Province
 Now Deh, Aliabad, Golestan Province
 Now Deh-e Hajjilar, Golestan Province
 Now Deh-e Malek, Golestan Province
 Now Deh-e Sharif, Golestan Province

Hamadan Province
 Now Deh, Hamadan, a village in Hamadan County
 Now Deh, Razan, a village in Razan County

Kermanshah Province
 Nowdeh, Kermanshah, a village in Sarpol-e Zahab County

Kurdistan Province
 Nowdeh, Kurdistan, a village in Baneh County

Lorestan Province
 Now Deh, Lorestan

Markazi Province
 Nowdeh, Ashtian, Markazi Province
 Nowdeh, Farahan, Markazi Province
 Now Deh, Khondab, Markazi Province

Mazandaran Province
 Now Deh, Amol, a village in Amol County
 Now Deh, Dabudasht, a village in Amol County
 Now Deh, Neka, a village in Neka County
 Now Deh, Nowshahr, a village in Nowshahr County
 Now Deh, Qaem Shahr, a village in Qaem Shahr County
 Now Deh, Sari, a village in Sari County
 Now Deh, Kolijan Rostaq, a village in Sari County

North Khorasan Province
 Now Deh, North Khorasan
 Now Deh Bam, North Khorasan Province
 Qareh Now Deh, North Khorasan Province

Qazvin Province
 Now Deh, Abyek, Qazvin Province
 Now Deh-e Lakvan, Qazvin Province
 Now Deh, Buin Zahra, Qazvin Province

Razavi Khorasan Province
 Now Deh-e Gonabad, a village in Gonabad County
 Now Deh-e Meyrmaharab, a village in Gonabad County
 Now Deh-e Pashtak, a village in Gonabad County
 Now Deh-e Arbab, a village in Khoshab County
 Now Deh, Mashhad, a village in Mashhad County
 Now Deh, Sabzevar, a village in Sabzevar County
 Now Deh-e Sorsoreh, a village in Sabzevar County
 Now Deh, Torbat-e Heydarieh, a village in Torbat-e Heydarieh County
 Nowdeh, Torbat-e Jam, a village in Torbat-e Jam County

Semnan Province
 Nowdeh-e Arbabi, a village in Garmsar County
 Nowdeh-e Khaleseh, a village in Garmsar County

South Khorasan Province
 Now Deh, Birjand, a village in Birjand County
 Now Deh, Sarayan, a village in Sarayan County
 Now Deh, Zirkuh, a village in Zirkuh County
 Nowdeh-e Olya, South Khorasan Province

Tehran Province
 Now Deh, Damavand, Tehran Province
 Now Deh, Robat Karim, Tehran Province

See also
 Deh Now (disambiguation)